Puente de Vallecas (Bridge of Vallecas) is one of the 21 districts of the city of Madrid, Spain. It forms, with the district of Villa de Vallecas, the geographical area of Vallecas.

Geography

Subdivision
The district is administratively divided into 6 wards (Barrios):
Entrevías
Numancia
Palomeras Bajas
Palomeras Sureste
Portazgo
San Diego

External links 

 
Districts of Madrid